Epelyx is a genus of beetles in the family Carabidae, containing the following species:

 Epelyx cordatus Baehr, 2004
 Epelyx latus Blackburn, 1892
 Epelyx lincolnensis Baehr, 2004
 Epelyx lindensis Blackburn, 1892
 Epelyx walkeri Baehr, 2004

References

Psydrinae